Unfinished may refer to:

Unfinished creative work, a work which a creator either chose not to finish or was prevented from finishing.

Music
 Symphony No. 8 (Schubert) "Unfinished"
 Unfinished (album), 2011 album by American singer Jordan Knight
 "Unfinished" (Kotoko song), stylized "→unfinished→", 2012
 "Unfinished" (Mandisa song), 2017
 "Unfinished", song by Stone Sour from the 2010 album Audio Secrecy
 "Unfinished", song by Mineral from the 1998 album EndSerenading

Television and film
 "Unfinished" (How I Met Your Mother), 2010 television show episode
 Unfinished (film), 2018 South Korean film

Literature
 Unfinished (book), a 2021 memoir by Priyanka Chopra

See also
 
 Unfinished symphony
 Unfinished building
 Finished (disambiguation)